Nicolas Florian (born 29 March 1969) is a French politician who was the mayor of Bordeaux from 2019 to 2020. He is a member of The Republicans.

See also
List of mayors of Bordeaux

References

1969 births
Living people
Mayors of Bordeaux
Members of the Regional Council of Nouvelle-Aquitaine
The Republicans (France) politicians
Politicians from Nouvelle-Aquitaine